Nososticta is a genus of damselfly in the family Platycnemididae.
It has a wide range from Africa, through Indonesia to Australia. They are commonly known as Threadtails.

Species 
The genus Nososticta includes the following species:

See also
 List of Odonata species of Australia

References

Platycnemididae
Zygoptera genera
Odonata of Asia
Odonata of Africa
Odonata of Oceania
Odonata of Australia
Taxa named by Hermann August Hagen
Damselflies